Estadio Santa Laura is a football stadium in Independencia, Santiago, Chile.  It is the home stadium of Unión Española.  The stadium holds 19,000 people and was built in 1922. It is a multi-use stadium, also used for concerts.

Deep Purple incident 
On February 27, 1997, English rock band Deep Purple performed at the stadium, this being the first time they performed in Chile. While performing the song "Fireball", the concert was marred by the collapse of the control tower. Nobody died, but approximately 44 people were injured.

References

Unión Española
Santa Laura
Santa Laura
Sports venues completed in 1922